The men's 4 × 400 metres relay event was part of the track and field athletics programme at the 1920 Summer Olympics. The competition was held on Sunday, August 22, 1920, and on Monday, August 23, 1920. Twenty-four runners from six nations competed.

Records

These were the standing world and Olympic records (in minutes) prior to the 1920 Summer Olympics.

Results

Semifinals

The semi-finals were held on Sunday, August 22, 1920.

Semifinal 1

Semifinal 2

Final

The final was held on Monday, August 23, 1920.

References

External links
 
 

Relay 4x400 metre
Relay foot races at the Olympics